Justice Schaller may refer to:

Albert Schaller, associate justice of the Minnesota Supreme Court
Barry R. Schaller, associate justice of the Connecticut Supreme Court